Ralph Hyde (25 March 1939 – 5 June 2015) was a curator of graphic arts at the Guildhall Library in London, a pre-eminent historian and writer on the subject of Panoramic painting.  On his retirement he lived for a time in France but returned to London to continue as an active scholar in the field.  In addition to having curated the Panoramania exhibition at the Barbican, he co-authored with Felix Barker the richly illustrated book London As It Might Have Been, which illustrates numerous planned, but never built, fanciful structures in London.  He was a member of the International Panorama Council, and at the time of his death was compiling a Dictionary of Panoramists.

References

 The Panorama: History of a Mass Medium (book review).  Technology and Culture: 40.4 (1999), pp. 900–901
 London as it Might Have Been.  Written with Felix Barker.  London: John Murray, 1984
 Panoramania! The Art and Entertainment of the All-Embracing View. Introduction by Scott B. Wilcox. London Trefoil Publications in association with the Barbican Art Gallery, 1988 
 Myrioramas, Endless Landscapes: The Story of a Craze, Print Quarterly, December 2004, XXI
 Paper Peepshows: The Jacqueline & Jonathan Gestetner Collection. London: Antique Collectors' Club, 2015

1939 births
2015 deaths
British art historians
British curators
Historians of cartography